Clerodendrum glabrum is a small to medium deciduous tree, widespread from Tropical to Southern Africa.

In common with others of this family, its bark is covered in prominent white lenticels. Leaves are usually in whorls of 3 and produce a fetid smell when crushed. The fragrant flowers are usually mauve with strongly exserted stamens and style, a common characteristic of the genus, and are borne in dense, terminal clusters. Closely related are Clerodendrum thomsoniae (Bleeding Heart) and Clerodendrum ugandense, known as Oxford and Cambridge bush because of its two tones of blue.

See also
List of Southern African indigenous trees

References

glabrum
Trees of South Africa
Flora of Kenya
Flora of Tanzania
Flora of Mozambique